Anton Franki (November 2, 1844 – January 30, 1908) was a Croatian church historian who was politically active in the Illyrian movement, which made him a victim of the Magyarization of the Ban Károly Khuen-Héderváry. He was professor in Zadar and Zagreb and was rector of the Greek Catholic Seminary in Zagreb.

Biography 
Anton Franki was born in Dalmatia, in the city of Omišalj. He was ordained a priest in 1867 for the Roman Catholic Diocese of Krk and continued his post-graduate studies in Vienna. After his doctoral studie in Vienna he returned to Dalmatia and became professor for Church history and Canon law in the Diocesan Seminary in Zadar in 1878.

Beside his theological work he was very interested in the Greek Catholic Church of Croatia and an exponent of the Croatian national movement. Because of this he moved to Zagreb, where the center of the movement was, and became a close friend of Tadija Smičiklas, a vanguard of the movement and professor at the Faculty of Philosophy at the University of Zagreb. Smičiklas attacked Ban Károly Khuen-Héderváry already and tried to focus all the Croatian intellectuals to defend the interest of Croatia against the Magyarization. Franki became 1882 professor for Speculative theology at the University of Zagreb, later he became professor for Church history.

In 1885 Franki became rector of the Greek Catholic Seminary in Zagreb. Franki became a leader and important advisor in the Eparchy of Križevci.

But in 1891 his secrete work against Ban Károly Khuen-Héderváry became public by an internal opponent and traitor. Franki lost his position as professor at the university and rector of the Greek Catholic Seminary. He had left the capital and returned to his hometown in poverty.

Selected bibliography

Sources

References 

1844 births
19th-century theologians
Eastern Catholic priests
Croatian Christian clergy
1908 deaths
19th-century Christian theologians
Historians of Christianity
Croatian Eastern Catholics
Academic staff of the University of Zagreb
People from Primorje-Gorski Kotar County